This is a list of films produced in Pakistan in 1995.

1995

See also
1995 in Pakistan

External links
 Search Pakistani film - IMDB.com

1995
Pakistani
Films